Moor Road is a tram stop for Phase 3b of the Manchester Metrolink. It opened on 3 November 2014. and is on the Airport Line on Moor Road at the junction of Bideford Drive.

Services
Trams run every 12 minutes north to Victoria and south to Manchester Airport. Between 03:00 and 06:00, a service operates between Deansgate-Castlefield and Manchester Airport every 20 minutes.

Ticket zones 
Moor Road is located in Metrolink ticket zone 3.

References

External links

 Metrolink stop information
 Moor Road area map
 Light Rail Transit Association
 Airport route map

Tram stops in Manchester
Railway stations in Great Britain opened in 2014
2014 establishments in England